Elections to the Bihar Legislative Assembly were held in February 1967, to elect members of the 318 constituencies in Bihar, India. The Indian National Congress won the most seats as well as the popular vote, but Mahamaya Prasad Sinha of the Jana Kranti Dal was appointed as the Chief Minister of Bihar.

After the recommendations of the Delimitation Commission of India were taken into account, the constituencies in Bihar was set at 318.

Result

Elected Members

See also 
 List of constituencies of the Bihar Legislative Assembly
 1967 elections in India

References

Bihar
1967
1967